Athyra is a fantasy novel by American writer Steven Brust, the sixth book in his Vlad Taltos series, set in the fantasy world of Dragaera. Originally published in 1993, by Ace Books, it was reprinted in 2003 along with Orca in the omnibus The Book of Athyra. Following the trend of the Vlad Taltos books, it is named after one of the Great Houses and features that House as an important element to its plot.

Plot summary

Vlad has traveled through Dragaera for over two years. He now wears normal clothing, has discarded most of his assassin arsenal, and has lost a finger. While entering the village of Smallcliff, he meets Savn, a Teckla boy apprenticed to the local physicker. The two strike up a brief conversation, and Savn is often confused by Vlad's behavior, as he has never seen an Easterner before. Vlad's arrival in town is concurrent with the mysterious death of Reins, a former servant of the Baron of Smallcliff.

Vlad shows up again at the local inn, causing a stir. He talks to Savn and becomes interested in Reins's death. While most of the village assumes that Vlad killed Reins, Vlad begins to believe that the death did have something to do with him. After some questioning, Vlad determines that the Baron of Smallcliff is still Loraan, an Athyra wizard he killed during the events of Taltos. The time Savn spends with Vlad in public alienates him from his friends in the village.

Savn takes Vlad to some nearby caves at his request and begins learning about witchcraft, sorcery, and thinking for himself. Vlad tells him that Loraan is an undead necromancer who killed Reins to draw Vlad out for a Jhereg assassin. Savn also becomes acquainted with Vlad's two jhereg, who are on constant lookout for assassins. Recurring sections from the point of view of Rocza reveal that she obeys the "Provider" only out of obligation to her mate, Loiosh.

Vlad describes his plan to tunnel into Loraan's manor and use the caves' "dark water" to kill him. Before he can put his plan in action, however, he is attacked at the inn by Loraan's men. Vlad fights them off but becomes seriously wounded before teleporting away. Using Vlad's comments about sorcery as a guide, Savn locates Vlad and treats his injuries, which include a pneumothorax. While the rest of the village searches for Vlad, Savn recruits the master physicker and they fight off Vlad's infection.

While recuperating, Vlad confirms Savn's growing suspicion that Vlad has been manipulating him in order to get his help. Savn goes to Loraan's manor and discovers that Vlad's allegations about him are true. Savn is thrown into a cell with his master, who has already been tortured into revealing Vlad's location. Savn treats his master and kills the guard to escape and warn Vlad. He contacts Rocza and summons Vlad into Loraan's cellar, where Loraan and the Jhereg assassin Ishtvan suddenly appear.

Savn realizes that Vlad is still too wounded to fight off his attackers. Remembering Vlad's lesson about thinking for himself, Savn dispels his irrational fear of his Baron and uses the caves' "dark water" to menace the undead Loraan. Vlad uses the distraction to kill Ishtvan, but collapses immediately afterward. Robbed of his power, Loraan simply begins throttling Savn until Rocza slips Ishtvan's Morganti dagger into Savn's hand. Savn kills Loraan with the dreaded dagger, but the horror of the ordeal, and a subsequent head injury, snaps his mind.

After reaching safety and healing completely, Vlad resolves to take responsibility for Savn's near catatonic state and seek out treatment for the boy he used.

Trivia and Allusions
 This is the first Vlad novel to feature a third-person narrative.
 This is also the first Vlad novel to feature the narrative mostly through the point of view of a character other than Vlad (Savn).

The House of the Athyra
House Athyra is one of the noble Houses of the Dragaeran Empire. Members of the House are renowned for their academics and mental prowess. Athyra view knowledge as a means to power and pursue it zealously, focusing either on external study or internal contemplation. Athyra commonly become wizards due to the power of magical knowledge. They generally live solitary lifestyles, cloistered away from society in their pursuit of arcana. As a result, they often gain cold and cruel dispositions. They wear red and white as the colors of their House, and have noble's points that indicate their noble status.

The House is named after the athyra, a large bird that uses psionics to attract prey and repel predators.

References

1993 American novels
American fantasy novels
Dragaera
1993 fantasy novels
Novels by Steven Brust